Vir Bahadur Singh (18 February 1935 – 30 May 1989) was an Indian politician belonging to the Indian National Congress. He was Chief Minister of Uttar Pradesh and Minister of Communications. He was also an author.

Personal life

Childhood and early life 
Vir Bahadur Singh was born in Gorakhpur. He was born in a Rajput family.

Family 
His son, Fateh Bahadur Singh who studied in Colonel Brown Cambridge School, Dehradun has been the minister several times in Uttar Pradesh cabinet (Forest Minister of U.P.).

Political career
Vir Bahadur Singh remained Chief Minister of Uttar Pradesh from 24 September 1985 till 25 June 1988.

He was appointed Union Minister of Communication in 1988, by Rajiv Gandhi.

Late Om Prakash Pandey & Mr. Brij Bhushan Singh were his close aides. Vir Bahadur Singh has delegated his political activities in Eastern Uttar Pradesh to them. They were very active budding leaders in the belt of Allahabad University, Banaras Hindu University & Purvanchal University. The political activities at the grass root i.e. "student leadership at university level" touched its zenith under the leadership of Om Prakash Pandey. The root cause of their political success was Om Prakash's populist measures towards people atrocities & swift decision making. The sudden death of Om Prakash Pandey due to unknown reason in early 1988 broke the reign of burgeoning student political water in the region. All student associations dispersed after his death as Mr. Brij Bhushan Singh who was too young to accept the responsibility therefore withdrew from political career.

The same proved the major setback for Vir Bahadur Singh and his political career hence losing majority in state assembly in June 1988.

Offices

Chief Minister of Uttar Pradesh 
Singh was appointed the 13th Chief Minister of Uttar Pradesh on 24 September 1985 and remained for a period of 2 years and 274 days, till 2 August 1988. At that time he was Member of Uttar Pradesh Legislative Assembly from Paniyara. He succeeded N. D. Tiwari who was also Chief Minister before him. He was the first Chief Minister of Uttar Pradesh from Gorakhpur. He lost the Chief Ministership in a party reshuffle when he resigned as CM to join the Union Cabinet as Minister for Communications.

Minister of Communications 
After resignation from the position of Chief Minister of Uttar Pradesh, he was assigned the position of Minister of Communications of India on the 25 June 1988 and remained till 30 May 1989, under Rajiv Gandhi ministry.

Death 
Veer Bahadur Singh died on 30 May 1989 in Paris, France at the age of 54 during his visit.

Books 

 From Naoroji to Nehru: Six essays in Indian economic thought
 ISBN: 
 Country  : India
 Language  : English
 Edition  : Unknown (174 pages)
 Publisher : Macmillan Company of India (1975)
 Essays in Indian political economy, by V. B. Singh
 ASIN  : ASIN B0017YGGLA
 Country  : India
 Language  : English
 Edition  : Unknown (302 pages)
 Publisher : (1967)
 An evaluation of fair price shops
 ASIN  : ASIN B0017YK7FG
 Country  : India
 Language  : English
 Edition  : Unknown
 Publisher : (1973)
 Indian economy yesterday and today.
 ASIN  : ASIN B0017YK7LA
 Country  : India
 Language  : English
 Edition  : Unknown
 Publisher : (1970)
 An introduction to the study of Indian labour problems
 ASIN  : ASIN B0017YGGOW
 Country  : India
 Language  : English
 Edition  : Unknown
 Publisher : (1967)
 Labour research in India
 ASIN  : ASIN B0014MJYPA
 Country  : India
 Language  : English
 Edition  : Unknown
 Publisher : (1970)
 Multinational corporations and India
 ASIN  : ASIN B0000D5PLP
 Country  : India
 Language  : English
 Edition  : Unknown (161 pages)
 Publisher : Sterling (1979)
 Patterns of economic development. A study of the economic development of the UK, the US, Japan, the USSR, and China.
 ASIN  : ASIN B0017YLW96
 Country  : India
 Language  : English
 Edition  : Unknown
 Publisher : (1970)
 Studies in African economic development
 ASIN  : ASIN B0017YGGUQ
 Country  : India
 Language  : English
 Edition  : Unknown
 Publisher : (1972)
 Role of labour in economic development
 ASIN  : ASIN B0014MLLB0
 Country  : India
 Language  : English
 Edition  : Unknown
 Publisher : (1970)
 Social and economic change. Essays in honour of Prof. D. P. Mukerji
 ASIN  : ASIN B0017YGMGO
 Country  : India
 Language  : English
 Edition  : Unknown
 Publisher : (1970)
 Theories of economic development
 ASIN  : ASIN B0017YK7TC
 Country  : India
 Language  : English
 Edition  : Unknown
 Publisher : (1971)
 Wage patterns, mobility, and savings of workers in India: A study of Kanpur textile industry
 ASIN  : ASIN B0014MMY20
 Country  : India
 Language  : English
 Edition  : Unknown
 Publisher : (1973)

Other
 Vir Bahadur Singh Planetarium, Gorakhpur
 Vir Bahadur Singh Purvanchal University, Jaunpur
 Bir Bahadur Singh Sports College, Gorakhpur
 Vir Bahadur Singh Degree College, Gorakhpur affiliated to Deendayal Upadhyaya Gorakhpur University

References

Bibliography

External links 
 Chief Ministers of Uttar Pradesh
 Chief Ministers of Uttar Pradesh

Indian National Congress politicians
People from Uttar Pradesh
People from Gorakhpur
Chief Ministers of Uttar Pradesh
1990 deaths
Uttar Pradesh MLAs 1985–1989
Chief ministers from Indian National Congress
1935 births